Inwa Yazawin is a lost Burmese chronicle that covers the history of the Ava Kingdom. The chronicle's existence was first mentioned in an early 15th-century chronicle called Yazawin Kyaw that did survive. At least some portions survived down to the 1720s as they were referenced in Maha Yazawin, the official chronicle of Toungoo Dynasty.

References

Bibliography
 
 

Burmese chronicles